Womyn is one of several alternative political spellings of the English word women, used by some feminists. There are other spellings, including womban (a reference to the womb or uterus) or womon (singular), and wombyn or wimmin (plural). Recently, the term womxn has been used by intersectional feminists to indicate the same ideas while foregrounding or more explicitly including transgender women and women of color.

Historically, "womyn" and other spelling variants were associated with regional dialects (e.g. Scottish English) and eye dialect (e.g. African American Vernacular English).

Old English

Old English had a system of grammatical gender, whereby every noun was treated as either masculine, feminine or neuter, similar to modern German. In Old English sources, the word man was grammatically masculine but gender-neutral in meaning. One of its meanings was similar to the modern English usage of "one" as a gender-neutral indefinite pronoun (compare with mankind (man + kind), which means the human race, and German , which has retained the indefinite pronoun meaning to the modern day). The words wer and wīf were used, when necessary, to specify a man or woman, respectively. Combining them into werman or wīfman expressed the concept of "any man" or "any woman". Some feminist writers have suggested that this more symmetrical usage reflected more egalitarian notions of gender at the time.

18th, 19th, and early 20th century uses
The term wimmin was considered by George P. Krapp (1872–1934), an American scholar of English, to be eye dialect, the literary technique of using nonstandard spelling that implies a pronunciation of the given word that is actually standard. The spelling indicates that the character's speech overall is dialectal, foreign, or uneducated. This form of nonstandard spelling differs from others in that a difference in spelling does not indicate a difference in pronunciation of a word.  That is, it is dialect to the eye rather than to the ear.  It suggests that a character "would use a vulgar pronunciation if there were one" and "is at the level of ignorance where one misspells in this fashion, hence mispronounces as well."

The word womyn appeared as an Older Scots spelling of woman in the Scots poetry of James Hogg. The word wimmin appeared in 19th-century renderings of Black American English, without any feminist significance.

Contemporary usage

In the United States 
The usage of "womyn" as a feminist spelling of women (with womon as the singular form) first appeared in print in 1976 referring to the first Michigan Womyn's Music Festival. This is just after the founding of the Mountain Moving Coffeehouse for Womyn and Children, a lesbian feminist social event centred around women's music. Both the annual "MichFest" and the weekly coffeehouse operated a womyn-born womyn (cisgender women-only) policy. Womyn's land was another usage of the term, associated with separatist feminism.

Z. Budapest promoted the use of the word wimmin (singular womon) in the 1970s as part of her Dianic Wicca movement, which claims that present-day patriarchy represents a fall from a matriarchal golden age.

These re-spellings existed alongside the use of herstory, a feminist re-examination and re-telling of history. Later, another wave of female-produced music was known as the riot grrrl movement.

The word "womyn" has been criticized by trans activists due to its usage in radical feminist circles which exclude trans women from identifying into the category of "woman" and consequently prevent them from accessing spaces and resources for women; the term wombyn has been particularly criticized for this since it implies that a woman must have a womb to be a woman.

In the United Kingdom
Millie Tant, a fictional character in the British satirical comic Viz, often used the term wimmin when discussing women's rights.

Similar terms 
"Womxn" has been used in a similar manner as womyn and wimmin. Due to transgender women's perceived exclusion from the usage of these respellings, an "x" is used to "broaden the scope of womanhood," to include them. The Womxn's March on Seattle chose the spelling of its title for this reason.

See also 

 Feminist language reform
 Gender-neutral language
 LGBT linguistics
 We'Moon
 Womyn-born womyn
 Womxn

References

Further reading

Sol Steinmetz. "Womyn: The Evidence," American Speech, Vol. 70, No. 4 (Winter, 1995), pp. 429–437

Feminism and the arts
Feminist terminology
Women-related neologisms
1970s neologisms
Nonstandard spelling
Feminism and transgender